Rail transportation in the Philippines is currently used mostly to transport passengers within Metro Manila and provinces of Laguna and Quezon, as well as a commuter service in the Bicol Region. Freight transport services once operated in the country, but these services were halted. However, there are plans to restore old freight services and build new lines. World War II, natural calamities, underspending, and neglect have all contributed to the decline of the Philippine railway network. In the 2019 Global Competitiveness Report, the Philippines has the lowest efficiency score among other Asian countries in terms of efficiency of train services, receiving a score of 2.4, and ranking 86th out of 101 countries globally.

The Philippine railway network consists of two commuter lines provided by the Philippine National Railways (PNR) and three urban mass transit lines operated by the Light Rail Transit Authority and Metro Rail Transit Corporation, all of which are located in Luzon. Within the last century, there were operating intercity rail lines extending from Manila both north and south operated by PNR. There were also lines on the Panay and Cebu islands, operated by Panay Railways, which currently does not own rolling stock or rail, only property.

History

Luzon

There has been rail transport in the Philippines for over 120 years.  On June 25, 1875, King Alfonso XII of Spain promulgated a Royal Decree directing the Office of the Inspector of Public Works of the Philippines to submit a general plan for railroads on Luzon. The plan, which was submitted five months later by Don Eduardo Lopez Navarro, was entitled Memoria Sobre el Plan General de Ferrocarriles en la Isla de Luzón, and was promptly approved. A concession for the construction of a railway line from Manila to Dagupan was granted to Don Edmundo Sykes of the Ferrocarril de Manila-Dagupan on June 1, 1887. The construction and running of the railway was done by Manila Railway Company Ltd that was a British owned company. The first rail tracks were laid in 1891 and its first commercial run was in 1892.

With the American takeover of the Philippines, the Philippine Commission allowed the Manila Electric Railroad and Light Company (Meralco) to take over the properties of the Compañia de los Tranvias de Filipinas, with the first of twelve mandated electric tranvia (tram) lines operated by Meralco opening in Manila in 1905. At the end of the first year around 63 kilometers (39 mi) of track had been laid.  A five-year reconstruction program was initiated in 1920, and by 1924, 170 cars serviced many parts of the city and its outskirts.  Although it was an efficient system for the city's 220,000 inhabitants, by the 1930s the streetcar network had stopped expanding.

At the Tutuban Central Terminal in a bustling district of old Manila was the terminal of the Philippine National Railways for two lines, to the north and to the south. From the center of Manila towards Baguio in the north, the line ended in San Fernando, La Union while the south line stopped in Legazpi in the Bicol region. To and from these points it carried people and their goods, their trade and livelihood.

In 1936, the first standard-gauge railway was introduced to the Philippines in the form of two Climax locomotives for the Dahican Lumber Company (DALCO). These were originally built in 1917 for the San Joaquin and Eastern Railroad in California and were sold after their closure in 1933. In July 1941, a 3T type Shay locomotive was also acquired from the Finkbine-Guild Lumber Company. The status of this short-line railroad after the war remains unknown.

Most of the improvements on the rail network were destroyed during Japanese invasion of the Philippines during the World War II. Of the more than a thousand route-kilometers before the war, only 452 were operational after it. For several years after the war, work was undertaken on what could be salvaged of the railroad system. By the war's end, the tram network was also damaged beyond repair amid a city that lay in ruins.  It was dismantled and jeepneys became the city's primary form of transportation, plying the routes once served by the tram lines.  With the return of buses and cars to the streets, traffic congestion became a problem.

In 1966, the Philippine government granted a franchise to Philippine Monorail Transport Systems (PMTS) for the operation of an inner-city monorail.  The monorail's feasibility was still being evaluated when the government asked the Japan International Cooperation Agency (JICA) to conduct a separate transport study.  Prepared between 1971 and 1973, the JICA study proposed a series of circumferential and radial roads, an inner-city rapid transit system, a commuter railway, and an expressway with three branches.  After further examination, many recommendations were adopted; however, none of them involved rapid transit and the monorail was never built.  PMTS' franchise subsequently expired in 1974. Another study was performed between 1976 and 1977, this time by Freeman Fox and Associates and funded by the World Bank.  It originally suggested a street-level railway, but its recommendations were revised by the newly formed Ministry of Transportation and Communications (now the DOTr).  The ministry instead called for an elevated system because of the city's many intersections.

Introduction of rapid transit 
President Marcos created the Light Rail Transit Authority (LRTA) in 1980. The first lady Imelda Marcos, then governor of Metro Manila and minister of human settlements, became its first chairman. Construction of LRT Line 1 started in September 1981, test-run in March 1984, and the first half of the line from Baclaran to Central Terminal opened on December 1, 1984. The second half, from Central Terminal to Monumento, opened on May 12, 1985. Overcrowding and poor maintenance took its toll a few years after opening.  With Japan's ODA amounting to 75 billion yen in total, the construction of LRT Line 2 began in the 1990s, and the first section of the line, from Santolan to Araneta Center-Cubao, was opened on April 5, 2003.  The second section, from Araneta Center-Cubao to Legarda, was opened exactly a year later, with the entire line being fully operational by October 2004. During that time Line 1 was modernized.  Automated fare collection systems using magnetic stripe plastic tickets were installed; air-conditioned trains added; pedestrian walkways between Lines 1, 2, and the privately operated 3 were completed.  In 2005, the LRTA made a profit of ₱68 million, the first time the agency made a profit since the Line 1 became operational in 1984.

Rehabilitation
In the early 2000s, the government worked to rehabilitate rail transportation in the country, including the Philippine National Railways, through various investments and projects. Total reconstruction of rail bridges and tracks, including replacement of the current 35-kilogram (77-pound) track with newer 50-kilogram (110-pound) tracks and the refurbishing of stations, were part of the rehabilitation and expansion process.  Much of those plans such as the Northrail Project were controversial and were never completed, due to allegations of being overpriced and anomalous.

MRT Line 3, which deteriorated since 2014 due to poor maintenance, underwent a total rehabilitation from 2019 to 2021, which is intended to restore it to its original state.

Expansion 
As part of the government's recent investments in transportation in the country, numerous projects are ongoing to expand and rehabilitate the railways in Luzon. Projects include the North–South Commuter Railway, a  line from New Clark City in Capas, Tarlac to Calamba, Laguna, the Metro Manila Subway, a  underground rapid transit line from Quezon City to Taguig and NAIA Terminal 3, the LRT Line 1 South Extension, which would extend LRT Line 1 from Baclaran to Niog, the Subic–Clark Railway, a freight line from Subic to Clark, the PNR Batangas Railway, a new branch line serving commuters to and from Batangas, and the PNR South Long Haul, a total reconstruction and expansion of South Main Line from Manila to Matnog.

The current PNR service is also being expanded, with the PNR Metro Commuter now servicing Caloocan and Malabon. PNR is also planning to reintroduce services to the Carmona branch line. New rolling stock was also acquired from PT INKA in Indonesia.

Panay
From the beginning of the American colonial period of the Philippines, the new American colonial Insular Government was committed to building new railways. The Philippine Railway Company, predecessor of the current Panay Railways, was incorporated in Connecticut on March 5, 1906.  It was part of a "Manila syndicate", a collection of Philippine infrastructure companies including the Manila Electric Railway and Light Company, incorporated in New Jersey, the Manila Construction Company, and the Manila Suburban Railways Company.  Later the Philippines Railways Construction Company was added. Cornelius Vanderbilt and William Salomon, among other leading American railwaymen sat on the board.

On May 28, 1906, the Philippine Commission granted to the Philippine Railway Corporation a concession to construct railways on the islands of Panay, Negros and Cebu.Construction began on a railroad from Iloilo City to Roxas City in Capiz with crews working from both cities and meeting in the middle in 1907.   Operations began immediately upon completion.  In 1985, passenger operations ceased while in 1989 freight operations ceased.

Cebu
The Philippine Railway Company, along with operating the Panay line, operated a line in Cebu from 1911 to 1942, when operations ceased because of the Japanese occupation of the Philippines during World War II.  The line ran from Danao south through Cebu City to Argao. The line was built by the related Philippine Railways Construction Company.

Services

Commuter rail
The Philippines currently has three operational commuter lines: the PNR Metro Commuter Line, located in Metro Manila, the PNR Inter-Provincial Commuter between Laguna and Quezon, and the PNR Bicol Commuter Line, located in the Bicol Region. All of these lines are operated by Philippine National Railways.

PNR Metro Commuter Line 

The PNR Metro Commuter line stretches from Tondo, Manila to the southern and northern edge of Metro Manila. It links the cities of Manila, Caloocan, Malabon, Makati, Taguig, Parañaque and Muntinlupa and the province of Laguna. Currently, there are 31 railway stations, with more stations planned to be reopened in the future. The current line is colored orange on most maps.

The line will be superseded by the North–South Commuter Railway upon its completion.

PNR Inter-Provincial Commuter 

The Inter-Provincial Commuter is a 44-kilometer (27 mi) commuter and regional rail service between San Pablo, Laguna and Lucena, Quezon. It has been proposed as part of the PNR South Long Haul project in 2019. The service had its first trial run on February 14, 2022, and was reopened on June 26.

PNR Bicol Commuter 
The PNR Bicol Commuter line operates in the Bicol Region. Launched in 2009, the system serves passengers to and from Sipocot, Naga and Legazpi, with one train a day.

Rapid transit 
There are two rapid transit systems operating in the country: the Manila Light Rail Transit System, and the Manila Metro Rail System, both serving passengers in Metro Manila. Many passengers who ride the systems also take various forms of road-based public transport, such as buses, to and from a station to reach their intended destination. Beep, a contactless smart card, is used to pay fares for the lines.

Manila Light Rail Transit System 

The Manila Light Rail Transit System is one of the two rapid transit systems serving the Metro Manila area of the Philippines. There are two lines to the system: Line 1 and Line 2 The system is under the jurisdiction of the Light Rail Transit Authority, although the Light Rail Manila Corporation is responsible for the operations and maintenance of Line 1.

Although the system is referred to as a "light rail" system, arguably because the network is mostly elevated, the system is more akin to a rapid transit (metro) system in European-North American terms. The Manila LRT system is the first metro system in Southeast Asia, earlier than the Singapore MRT by three years.

LRT Line 1, opened in 1984, travels a north–south route. LRT Line 2, opened in 2003, travels along an east–west route. All of the stations of LRT lines 1 and 2 are elevated, except for the Katipunan station (which is underground).

The system is not related to the MRT, or the Yellow Line, which forms a completely different but linked system.

Manila Metro Rail Transit System 

The Metro Rail Transit (MRT) is the second rapid transit system serving Metro Manila in the Philippines. It originally began as a single line (MRT Line 3) that was first opened in 1999 and became fully operational by the year 2000. The MRT branding is currently associated with rapid transit lines in Metro Manila not under the jurisdiction of the LRTA, including lines 7 and 9, although the three lines will have different operators.

The system currently has 13 stations along  of mostly elevated track in an orbital north–south route. MRT Line 3, the first line in the system, opened in 1999.

Operators

Philippine National Railways

The Philippine National Railways (PNR) is a state-owned railway company. As of 2016, it operates one commuter rail service in Metro Manila and local services between Sipocot, Naga City and Legazpi City in the Bicol Region. PNR began operations on November 24, 1892, as the Ferrocarril de Manila-Dagupan, during the Spanish colonial period, and later becoming the Manila Railroad Company (MRR) during the American colonial period. It became the Philippine National Railways on June 20, 1964, by virtue of Republic Act No. 4156. The PNR is an agency of the Department of Transportation.

Light Rail Transit Authority 

The Light Rail Transit Authority, founded in 1981, is the owner of the Manila LRT system. It was the operator of LRT Line 1 and the current operator of LRT Line 2.

Light Rail Manila Corporation 

Light Rail Manila Corporation is a rail service company formed in 2014. It is the current operator of Line 1.

Metro Rail Transit Corporation 

A private consortium of seven companies, Metro Rail Transit Corporation is owner and operator of Line 3 under a Build–operate–transfer agreement with the Department of Transportation. It was formed in 1995.

Other 

 Panay Railways: a government owned and controlled corporation of the Philippines, the company previously operated services on the Panay and Cebu islands. Panay Railways currently does not own rail and rolling stock, only properties.
 SMC-Mass Rail Transit 7: previously known as the Universal LRT Corporation, the company will be the owner and operator of MRT Line 7 upon completion, under a build–operate–transfer agreement with the Department of Transportation. It is a subsidiary of San Miguel Corporation.

Railways under construction

Commuter rail

North–South Commuter Railway 

The North–South Commuter Railway (NSCR), is a  railway being constructed in Luzon. Partial operations will begin by 2021, and full operations is expected to begin by 2025.

Rapid transit

Line extensions 

Construction started in 2019, and is expected to be partially finished by 2024.
 LRT Line 2 west extension: LRT Line 2 will be extended by  westward. The west extension is projected to start by 2021.

MRT Line 7 

The Metro Rail Transit Line 7 (MRT Line 7) is a rapid transit line under construction. When completed, the line will be 22.8 kilometers long serviced by 14 stations. The line runs in a northeast–southwest direction, beginning at San Jose del Monte, Bulacan up to the under construction North Avenue Grand Central station located in North Avenue, Quezon City.

Metro Manila Subway

The Metro Manila Subway (MMS)  is an underground rapid transit line currently under construction in Metro Manila, Philippines. The  line, which will run north–south between Valenzuela City, Quezon City, Pasig, Makati, Taguig, and Pasay, consists of 15 stations between the Quirino Highway and FTI stations.

Makati Intra-city Subway 

The Makati Intra-city Subway is an 11-kilometer (6.8 mi) under-construction underground rapid transit line to be located in Makati, Metro Manila, that will link establishments across the city's business district. It will be built under a public-private partnership program between the Makati city government and a private consortium, led by Philippine Infradev Holdings. The subway was expected to begin construction by December 2020, and Makati Mayor Abigail Binay projects completion by the year 2025. On June 20, 2018, IRC Properties Inc. and its Chinese partners secured an ‘original proponent status’ from the city government of Makati for the proposed $3.7-billion Makati intra-city rail transport system. The subway will cost $3.7 billion (or ₱192 billion) and is expected to accommodate 700,000 passengers daily. It will also have ten stations, with connections to the existing Line 3, the Pasig River Ferry Service, and the approved Line 9 (Metro Manila Subway).

Planned or proposed

Rapid transit

Automated Guideway Transit System

The Department of Science and Technology has commenced a project to develop a locally designed and manufactured Automated Guideway Transit System.

Bicutan AGT — Originally one of the two proposed AGT lines, the other being the cancelled UP Diliman AGT. It will follow the alignment of General Santos Avenue and C-6 road in southern Taguig, connecting the offices of DOST and nearby areas.

Monorail 
 Baguio Monorail — A 4-km elevated monorail with 8 stations around the central business area will be funded by Metro Global Holdings Corporation through a public-private partnership.
 Davao People Mover —  A 28-kilometer monorail project has been endorsed by the City Government of Davao to the Department of Transportation (DOTr) and Philippine National Railways (PNR).
 Iloilo Monorail — BYD, a Shenzhen-based company conducted a two-month feasibility study to construct a monorail in Iloilo. The first phase of the 20-kilometer (12-mile) system was expected to start operations by 2019. This project was shelved after 2018.
SkyTrain (Metro Manila) — The construction of the SkyTrain is projected to cost ₱3.5 billion and is yet to commence. Infracorp will construct the monorail line for two years and planned to make the SkyTrain operational by the end of 2021. Infracorp aimed to commence Groundbreaking in Late 2020, but not update has been given as of December 7, 2020. The Monorail is also set to connect to the Makati Intra-city Subway, MRT 3 Guadalupe, and the Pasig River Ferry Service.
 Cebu Monorail —  Previously the Cebu LRT, the system will have two lines. One will be Central Line passing through downtown Cebu and its neighboring areas, and the Airport Line heading towards Mactan–Cebu International Airport. It is set to open before the end of 2021.
 Pasay Monorail — A 1.89 km monorail that will connect with MRT-3 Taft Station and LRT-1 EDSA Station to SM Mall of Asia.
 Pasig City Transit Express — A 16.35 kilometer monorail that connects within the urban of Pasig City.

Light rail 
 LRT Line 6 —  A proposed rapid transit line in Cavite that will connect with LRT Line 1 in Bacoor and end at Dasmariñas. The project is indefinitely shelved by the national government due to space constraints along Aguinaldo Highway where it will be routed, but a private firm has presented an unsolicited proposal that modifies the alignment so to follow Bacoor Boulevard and Molino-Paliparan Road, and include 4 branches serving southern Metro Manila. 
MRT 10 —  The project will be approximately 22.5 kilometers and a mostly elevated Light Railway Transit (LRT) System consisting of sixteen (16) stations along circumferential road C-5 connecting the Ninoy Aquino Terminal Airport (NAIA) Terminal 3 to Quezon City, terminating at Commonwealth Avenue with possible interchange with MRT7 at Tandang Sora Station and LRT Line 2 at Aurora Station. Trains will be stabled at the depot to be built at the UP property in Diliman, Quezon City. 
Pampanga Mass Transit System — An LRT system is proposed for the Center Line of the Pampanga Mass Transit System, having been originally proposed in 2018. It will be served by feeder bus rapid transit lines.
The line will have 22 stations running beside the river from Manila Bay to Laguna de Bay and some portions will be located beside the Pasig River Expressway.
Cagayan de Oro Metropolitan Railway A proposed railway system that will located on Northern Mindanao and CARAGA Regions. It has 2 phases, one of them will connect the cities of Cagayan de Oro and Butuan.

Heavy rail 
MRT Line 4 —  Initially proposed as a "heavy monorail" line, the line has been revised to heavy rail in September 2022.
MRT 8 —  The Metro Rail Transit Line 8, or MRT-8 (formerly designated as MRT-9, now designated to Metro Manila Subway), also known as PNR East-West Line, is a proposed rapid transit line in the Philippines. It would be a 9-kilometer (5.6 mi) railway system connecting Sampaloc, Manila and Diliman, Quezon City via Commonwealth Avenue, Quezon Avenue, and España Boulevard. The unsolicited proposal for the project was submitted to the Philippine government by Malaysia-based construction engineering company AlloyMTD group in 2016, and is awaiting approval by the National Economic Development Authority (NEDA). According to MTD Philippines, Inc. President Patrick Nicholas David, the project would cost ₱60 billion.
MRT 11 —  The project involves the construction of an approximately 18 kilometers Metro Railway Transit System (MRTS) of elevated structure starting from Epifanio Delos Santos Avenue (EDSA), Balintawak in Quezon City traversing along Quirino Highway, Novaliches and Zabarte Road in north Caloocan up to Barangay Gaya-gaya in San Jose del Monte, Bulacan. A passenger transfer facility shall be provided proximate to the EDSA-Balintawak station of LRT Line 1 and the MRT 11 Balintawak station.

Commuter rail 
The PNR Northeast Commuter Line or Cabanatuan–Makati line is a proposed reconstruction of the Balagtas–Cabanatuan branch of the North Main Line. It will branch off the northern half of the North–South Commuter Railway at Balagtas station in Bulacan. Once completed, it will become one of the three major commuter rail corridors in the Greater Capital Region, which consists of the NSCR and the intercity section of the South Main Line. It will connect Nueva Ecija and eastern Bulacan with Makati City in southern Metro Manila. There is also a proposed extension to San Jose, sealing a loop with the NSCR North Phase 4 between Tarlac City in Tarlac and San Jose.
The Cavite–Laguna Railway is a rail line connecting the two provinces neighboring Metro Manila to the south, Cavite and Laguna.

Intercity rail 

The PNR South Long Haul project will involve the reconstruction of the old South Main Line and its branch to Batangas City, both as unelectrified standard-gauge lines initially to operate on single-track configuration. It will be funded by the Chinese government. The line is set to be partially operational by 2022.
Considered to be one of the primary infrastructure projects of the Build! Build! Build! Infrastructure Plan, the Mindanao Railway will consist of about 2,000 kilometers of trackage, with construction of the system divided into phases. The first phase, which is 105 km, is expected to be completed by 2022. The second phase will commence its feasibility study by 2021. The initial railway will connect the cities of Tagum, Davao City and Digos in Davao Region, and the cities of General Santos and Koronadal (Marbel) in Soccsksargen Region with planned phases to connect other major cities in Mindanao, such as Cagayan de Oro, Zamboanga City, Cotabato City and Butuan.
There are two projects being proposed to reconstruct and extend the PNR North Main Line's intercity section beyond New Clark City in Capas, Tarlac.
The North Long Haul Inter-Regional Railway, simply known as the North Long Haul and previously known as the North Long Haul West is the planned long-distance rail system between Manila and northern Luzon. The project is divided into four phases: Phase 1 will be the overhaul of the old PNR North Main Line from Manila to Poro Point Freeport Zone in San Fernando, La Union; Phase 2 will cover the old line's reconstruction to Bacnotan and its extension to Vigan; Phase 3 will be from Vigan to Laoag; and Phase 4 is the Northeast Long Haul line to the Cagayan Valley.
The Northeast Long Haul line, previously the North Long Haul East is the Phase 4 of the North Long Haul project as well as the latest plan to connect the Cagayan Valley to the rest of Luzon by rail, a project in its planning stages since 1875. If it follows the original 1962 plans, its most notable feature is a  railway tunnel, the longest of its kind in the country and would be the highest point in the entire PNR system. There is also a planned extension to Aparri, as well as connecting the two main lines through a series of rail lines passing the Cordillera Administrative Region.
The Philippine National Railways is interested in constructing a train network in the Visayas, to be known as the Visayas Railway, although no formal proposals have been made. On its vision statement, the PNR aims to become a transnational railroad operator covering all three major island groups in the country including the Visayas. Since 2016, two House Bills were sponsored for the reorganization of the PNR into three government-owned and controlled corporations, one of them being the Visayas Railway Corporation (VRC).
The Panay Railways aims to rebuild its network as a loop line around Panay island. Initially a  segment will be built between Iloilo City and Roxas, Capiz. The segment is estimated to cost US$1.5 billion. Planned extensions include a segment to Malay, Aklan and towards Antique before completing the loop in Iloilo City.
The Samar–Leyte rail project aims to construct a network in the islands of Samar and Leyte. This proposal was announced during the 4th Philippine Railway Summit on October 26, 2022.

Freight rail 
The Subic–Clark Railway will be part of the PNR Luzon system development. Initially a freight railway, the line will connect Clark and New Clark City to Subic, forming a connected logistics hub in Central Luzon.
Manila–Laguna freight revival – The Department of Transportation said it plans to revive the operation of a container cargo rail from Port Area in Manila to Laguna province. The tracks towards the berths of Manila International Container Terminal and Manila North Harbor to Laguna Gateway Inland Container Terminal in Calamba, Laguna will be revived to restart the container cargo service.
 North Philippine Dry Port Container Rail Transport Service shall connect freight trains from the Port of Manila to an inland terminal in Balagtas, Bulacan.

Under-conceptualization 

 San Mateo Railway – planned railway that will connect San Mateo, Rizal to Rodriguez and Quezon City.
 Northern Mindanao Railway Project – planned railway in Northern Mindanao.

See also

Department of Transportation
Public transport in Manila
Department of Public Works and Highways
Strong Republic Transit System (SRTS)
Transportation in the Philippines
List of rail accidents in the Philippines
Charles M. Swift, founder of Meralco and Panay Railways

Notes

References

Sources

Further reading

External links